Aaron Summers may refer to:

 Aaron Summers (cricketer) (born 1996), Australian cricketer
 Aaron Summers (rugby league) (born 1981), Welsh rugby league player
 Aaron Summers (speedway rider) (born 1988), Australian speedway rider